Rathedaung Township is a township of Sittwe District in the Rakhine State of Myanmar. The principal town is Rathedaung. Communal clashes of June 2012 also spread into that township and at least there were three Buddhist casualties.

References

Townships of Rakhine State
Sittwe